Kutina is a city in central Croatia. It may also refer to

Kutina, Ravno, a village in Bosnia and Herzegovina
Marina Kutina, a village in Serbia
Prva Kutina, a village in Serbia
Kuteena or Kutina, a village in India
Spokoyny (volcano) in Kamchatka, Russia, also known as Kutina
Joe Kutina (1885–1945), American Major League Baseball baseman